Luís Flores (born 9 March 1994) is a Puerto Rican swimmer. He competed in the men's 100 metre freestyle event at the 2017 World Aquatics Championships.

References

1994 births
Living people
Puerto Rican male swimmers
Place of birth missing (living people)
Puerto Rican male freestyle swimmers